Sheniqua S. "Nikki" Greene (born September 6, 1990) is an American professional basketball player.

College career
Greene played college basketball for the Penn State Lady Lions between 2009 and 2013.

Statistics
Source

Professional career
Greene was selected 26th overall in the 2013 WNBA draft by the Phoenix Mercury.

For the 2013–14 season, Greene played in South Korea for Samsung Life Blueminx. She returned to the U.S. in 2014 and made her WNBA debut for the Los Angeles Sparks.

Greene split the 2014–15 season in Israel for A.S. Ramat Hasharon Electra and in Poland for CCC Polkowice. In 2015, she played her second season in the WNBA for the Connecticut Sun.

Greene returned to Polkowice for the 2015–16 season and played in Poland again in 2016–17 for Sleza Wroclaw. For the 2017–18 season, she played for Bnot Hertzeliya in Israel. She returned to Hertzeliya for the 2018–19 season, but left in January 2019 to play out the season in Poland with Pszczolka AZS-UMCS Lublin.

In 2019, Greene played in Australia for the Hobart Huskies of the NBL1.

For the 2019–20 and 2020–21 seasons, Greene played in France for Angers - Union Feminine Basket 49.

In 2022, Greene moved to New Zealand to play in the Tauihi Basketball Aotearoa for Whai, where she won the league's Defensive Player of the Year.

References

External links
WNBA profile
Penn State Lady Lions bio

1990 births
Living people
African-American basketball players
American expatriate basketball people in Australia
American expatriate basketball people in France
American expatriate basketball people in Israel
American expatriate basketball people in New Zealand
American expatriate basketball people in Poland
American expatriate basketball people in South Korea
American women's basketball players
Basketball players from Texas
Centers (basketball)
Connecticut Sun players
Los Angeles Sparks players
People from North Charleston, South Carolina
Phoenix Mercury draft picks
Power forwards (basketball)
21st-century African-American sportspeople
21st-century African-American women
Tauihi Basketball Aotearoa players